The coat of arms of British Columbia is the heraldic symbol representing the Canadian province of British Columbia. The arms contains symbols reflecting British Columbia's British heritage along with local symbols. At the upper part of the shield is the Union Jack, representing the United Kingdom. The lower portion of the shield features a golden sun setting into the ocean, representing the province's location on the Pacific.

The original arms, consisting of only the shield, were granted by royal warrant of King Edward VII on March 31, 1906. The arms were further augmented with supporters, a crest, and a compartment, by royal warrant of Queen Elizabeth II on October 15, 1987.

A banner of arms comprises the provincial flag, which was adopted in 1960.

History

The first heraldic provincial symbol was the Great Seal of the province: the royal crest of the crowned lion upon the imperial crown, as was the usual practice for British colonies, but with the letters "BC" added. This design was created by Richard Clement Moody This design was used upon British Columbia joining Confederation.

The first coat of arms of the province was created by Canon Arthur Beanlands of Victoria, whose version was similar to the modern one: "The union device of Great Britain and Ireland: on a chief barry undée argent and azure, a setting sun in base Or." This coat was adopted by Order-in-Council 268 July 19, 1895, as the arms and great seal of the province per the authority inferred from Section 136 of the British North America Act.

While the design of the great seal was a provincial prerogative, coats of arms were (and are) honours granted by the sovereign. The province attempted to register the design with the English College of Arms in 1897, but was unable to do so for several reasons. First among them was the use of the royal crest, which is the exclusive right of the sovereign and could not be granted to another entity even as a sign of utmost loyalty to the Queen. The heralds objected to the placement of the Union Flag in an inferior position on the shield (conflicting with the popular slogan, "The sun never sets on the British Empire"). The use of supporters, a high honour, was considered presumptuous, as no other province had been granted such a privilege.

The shield only (with the positions of the Union Flag and setting sun reversed, and with the antique crown added), along with the motto, was granted in 1906. The achievement of arms was augmented with a crest, supporters, and compartment granted by Queen Elizabeth II, on 15 October 1987.

Symbolism

Crest
The crest is the Queen's royal crest (a gold lion statant gardant—standing on all fours and facing the viewer—wearing the royal crown), differenced with a garland of Pacific dogwood, the provincial flower.
Shield
The shield features a Union Flag in chief, with a crown (known heraldically as an antique crown) at its centre. In base it has the sun setting into the ocean, representing the province's location on the Pacific.
Compartment
The compartment is a garland of Pacific Dogwood.
Supporters
The supporters are a wapiti (also known as elk) stag and a bighorn sheep. The wapiti of Vancouver Island and the bighorn sheep of the mainland of the province symbolize the union of the two colonies which united to form British Columbia in 1866
Motto
The motto , is Latin and refers to the idea of the sun never setting over the British Empire.   (the form  is the ablative, required after the preposition ) literally means a "setting" or a "going down", such as of the sun, and by extension can refer to "the west".  While one can translate the phrase to mean "splendour without diminishment", in combination with the geographical position of British Columbia (in the far west of the former British Empire), the setting sun shown on the shield, and the old concept of the sun never setting over the Empire, the motto should be understood to express the idea "a shining without a sunset".

See also
Flag of British Columbia
Symbols of British Columbia
Canadian heraldry
National symbols of Canada
List of Canadian provincial and territorial symbols
Heraldry

References

External links
Coat of Arms of British Columbia (Government of BC)
 Arms and flag of British Columbia in the online Public Register of Arms, Flags and Badges

Provincial symbols of British Columbia
British Columbia
British Columbia
British Columbia
British Columbia
British Columbia
British Columbia
British Columbia
British Columbia